Terrence Edward Garrison (born January 19, 1949) is an American politician. He was elected to the North Carolina House of Representatives in 2016. A Democrat, he represented the 32nd district (including all of Vance and Warren counties, as well as part of Granville County from 2017 to 2023.

Electoral history

2022

2020

2018

2016

Committee assignments

2021-2022 session
Appropriations 
Appropriations - Education 
Commerce 
Insurance 
Wildlife Resources

2019-2020 session
Appropriations 
Appropriations - General Government 
Appropriations - Education 
Insurance 
Transportation 
Wildlife Resources

2017-2018 session
Appropriations
Appropriations - Transportation
Education - Community Colleges
Environment
Judiciary IV
State and Local Government I

References

Living people
Democratic Party members of the North Carolina House of Representatives
1949 births
21st-century American politicians
North Carolina Central University alumni
North Carolina A&T State University alumni